Saine is a surname. Notable people with this surname include:
 Brandon Saine (born 1988), American football player
 Lori Saine, American politician
 Pap Saine, Gambian newspaper publisher
 Thomas P. Saine (1941-2013), American educator

See also 
 Sain (disambiguation), which also lists persons with the name Sain